Theodore Eccleston Whitmore, OD (born 5 August 1972) is a Jamaican former professional footballer. He is the former head coach of Jamaica national football team.

Club career 

Whitmore attended St. James High School in Montego Bay, Jamaica. During his late teens, he worked as a Baked Goods delivery assistant with National Continental Foods, now National Baking Company, in Montego Bay before moving on to play football in the Jamaica National Premiere League. By default, he left his job at National Continental foods after the salesperson he worked for was terminated for stabbing a defenseless office employee in early 1992. As a very skillful and creative for a player despite his tall frame, he started his club career at Montego Bay Boys Club, and has since played for Violet Kickers and Seba United in his native Jamaica. He was signed on a free by English league side Hull City following a one-week trial with the club, where he played together with compatriot Ian Goodison, until an accident in Jamaica cut short his Hull career. Whitmore made his debut in an F.A. Cup tie against Macclesfield. On his league debut, away at Rochdale, Whitmore scored a league debut goal. During his 77 games for Hull, he became something of a fan favourite during a relatively unhappy time for the club; who were lurking in the basement of the English Football League, struggling with financial insecurities. Scottish team Livingston acquired his services in 2003, and in June 2004 he signed for Tranmere Rovers. He had his contract terminated in January 2006 by mutual consent. He returned to Jamaica to become player/coach for his former team Seba United.

International career 
Whitmore made his debut for Jamaica in a November 1993 friendly match against the United States, coming on as a late substitute for Hector Wright. Whitmore earned 105 official international caps and scored 24 goals for the Jamaica national team. He was a key member of the Reggae Boyz' squad during the second half of the 1990s, playing as a major catalyst for the Jamaicans as they advanced to their first and only World Cup in 1998. Although Jamaica was eliminated in the first round, Whitmore scored two goals in Jamaica's only win of the competition, a 2–1 victory against Japan. In that same year he was named Caribbean Footballer of the Year. His last international match was also against the United States, a 1–1 away draw on 17 November 2004 during 2006 World Cup qualification in which he was substituted for Jason Euell in the 72nd minute.

Managerial career

Seba United 
When Whitmore returned to Seba United in 2006, he returned as both a player and a coach.

Jamaica 
In November 2007, he was brought on as interim manager of the Jamaica national team after the firing of former manager Bora Milutinović. Jamaica won both games, friendlies against El Salvador and Guatemala, under his watch. He was then retained as an assistant under new coach Renê Simões. Simões lasted nine months as manager due to poor play in the third round of CONCACAF World Cup qualifiers, and upon his release on 11 September 2008, he was again appointed interim manager until newly appointed manager John Barnes would be available in November.

As interim manager in October 2008, Whitmore guided the Reggae Boyz to back-to-back 1–0 wins against Mexico and Honduras that gained him tremendous support as a manager and put the Jamaicans into range for advancement with one game remaining in semifinal round group play. He again took the reins of the national team when John Barnes left the position in June 2009, to take up a management job at Whitmore's former club Tranmere Rovers in the English League. Whitmore's team struggled during the 2009 CONCACAF Gold Cup and were eliminated in the first round. As a part of the national team rebuilding efforts which started in August 2009, he led the squad to three draws and one win to end 2009. In December 2010, he led Jamaica to the 2010 Digicel Cup title. After qualifying Jamaica for the CONCACAF Hexagonal final round in 2012, Whitmore resigned as head coach in June 2013. From December 2014 through February 2015, he served as Jamaica national u20 coach. In September 2016, Whitmore was named interim head coach of Jamaica In May 2018, Whitmore signed a four-year contract with the JFF. On 9 December 2021, Whitmore was dismissed as senior national team head coach. by the JFF.

Personal life 
Whitmore was injured in a car accident that led to the death of Reggae Boyz' teammate Stephen Malcolm. After the accident he was charged with manslaughter, of which he was later acquitted. In November 2013, Whitmore's 14-year-old son, Jouvhaine, died after being struck by a vehicle while riding his bicycle. Whitmore's second son Gianni is said to be his twin because they look exactly alike and he is as skilful and talented as his father in his prime.

Career statistics

International goals
Scores and results list Jamaica's goal tally first.

Managerial Statistics

Honours

Player 
Jamaica
Caribbean Cup: 1998, 2005

Manager 
Jamaica
Caribbean Cup: 2008 (as assistant), 2010 (as manager)

CONCACAF Gold Cup runners-up: 2017
Individual

 CONCACAF Gold Cup Best XI (Reserves): 2003
 Caribbean Footballer of the Year: 1998

See also
 List of men's footballers with 100 or more international caps

References

External links 

 
 Profile at ReggaeBoyzsc
 Profile at TheReggaeBoyz

1972 births
People from Montego Bay
Living people
Association football midfielders
Jamaican footballers
Jamaican football managers
Jamaica international footballers
Jamaican expatriate footballers
Expatriate footballers in England
Expatriate footballers in Scotland
Expatriate soccer players in South Africa
Montego Bay United F.C. players
Cape Town Spurs F.C. players
Hull City A.F.C. players
Livingston F.C. players
Tranmere Rovers F.C. players
English Football League players
Scottish Premier League players
1998 CONCACAF Gold Cup players
1998 FIFA World Cup players
2000 CONCACAF Gold Cup players
2003 CONCACAF Gold Cup players
National Premier League players
FIFA Century Club
Jamaica national football team managers
2011 CONCACAF Gold Cup managers
2017 CONCACAF Gold Cup managers
2019 CONCACAF Gold Cup managers
2021 CONCACAF Gold Cup managers